The 2005 World Military Cup took place in Warendorf, Germany. The Tournament is also known as CISM World Football Trophy.

Group stage

Group A

Group B

Group C

Group D

Quarterfinals

Semifinals

Third place match

Final

Winner

References

World Military Cup